Xosé María Díaz Castro (b. Guitiriz, 19 February 1914 – d. Lugo, 2 October 1990) was a Galician poet and translator.

Galician Literature Day is dedicated to him in 2014.

Work
Nimbos (1961) .

Authors that he translated
To Spanish: Verner von Heidenstam, Henrik Pontoppidan, Johannes Vilhelm Jensen, Rainer Maria Rilke, William Butler Yeats, T. S. Eliot, Walt Whitman, G. K. Chesterton, Frederick Forsyth, Friedrich Schiller, Arthur Rimbaud, Paul Valéry, Alphonse de Lamartine and Paul Claudel.

To English: Federico García Lorca and Rafael Alberti.

References

Further information
AAVV; Homenaxe a X. M. Díaz Castro, Xermolos, Guitiriz, 1987, 192 p., .
Blanco Torrado, A.; A ascensión dun poeta, Xosé María Díaz Castro, Novacaixagalicia, Compostela, 1995, 143 p., .
Requeixo, Armando;, Xosé María Díaz Castro, vida e obra, Editorial Galaxia, Vigo, 2014, 200 p., .

External links 

PoetaDiazCastro.com
  (14′43″) IES Poeta Díaz Castro.
 O instante eterno (9′52″) (Vimeo).

People from Terra Chá
Galician poets
Galician translators
1914 births
1990 deaths
Galician-language writers
20th-century translators
20th-century Spanish poets
Spanish male poets
University of Salamanca alumni
20th-century Spanish male writers